Simon Barrett may refer to:

 Simon Barrett (cricketer) (born 1988), English cricketer
 Simon Barrett (filmmaker) (born  1978), American writer, producer, and actor